Hot! Live and Otherwise is a combination live and in-studio album by American singer Dionne Warwick, released in 1981 on Arista Records. The LP was originally issued as number A2L 8605 in the Arista Catalog.

An extended version of this album is available having been issued on CD in 2007.

History
The live portion of the albums was recorded over several dates at Harrah's Casino in Reno, Nevada in the spring of 1981. The original 2-LP release featured three sides of live recordings, plus a fourth side of studio recordings, including the pop and AC hit "Some Changes Are for Good" and "Now We're Starting Over Again," which later became an Adult Contemporary hit for Natalie Cole in 1989 under the shortened title "Starting Over Again." Three of those studio recordings were produced by Michael Masser and the other two were produced by Steve Buckingham.

The album was reissued on CD in 2007 with new liner notes from David Nathan, a slightly amended track listing (missing the live track "We Never Said Goodbye" and one of the studio tracks "Dedicate This Heart"), and added two previously unissued studio bonus cuts, "When the Good Times Come Again" and "Right Back." The former song was written by Richard Kerr and Will Jennings – the same writing team that provided Warwick with her gold-selling comeback hit, "I'll Never Love This Way Again" in 1979.

Track listing

Personnel
Dionne Warwick - vocals
Lee Ritenour, Lee Valentine, Tim May - guitar
Lee Sklar, Ralph Rost - bass
Joe Kloess, Michael Masser, Stuart Levin - keyboards
Randy Goodrum - Fender Rhodes
Mel Lee, Rick Shlosser - drums
Harold Alexander - percussion
Darlene Love, Eunice Peterson - background vocals
The John Carlton Orchestra
Larry Wilcox - arrangements
Gene Page - string arrangements
Dick Bogart, Joe Neil, Mike Leitz - engineer

References

External links
Hot! Live and Otherwise  at Discogs

1981 live albums
1981 albums
Albums arranged by Gene Page
Albums produced by Michael Masser
Albums produced by Steve Buckingham (record producer)
Dionne Warwick live albums
Arista Records live albums
Dionne Warwick albums
Arista Records albums